Arnold Stearns Nesbitt (16 October 1878 – 7 November 1914) was an English first-class cricketer who played one match for Worcestershire against Middlesex at Lord's in 1914. His contribution to the game, which Worcestershire lost by an innings, was small: he made only one dismissal (that of Jack Hearne off the bowling of Robert Borrows), and scored 2 not out and 3 with the bat.

Nesbitt was born in Walton-on-Thames, Surrey. He was commissioned a Second lieutenant in the 3rd (Militia) Battalion of the Royal Irish Regiment on 24 January 1900. He was killed in action at Ploegsteert Wood, Belgium in the First World War, while serving as a captain in the Army.

Notes

External links
 

1878 births
1914 deaths
English cricketers
Worcestershire cricketers
British military personnel killed in World War I
Wicket-keepers